Xu Zhilun (20 June 1911 – 26 August 1999) was a Chinese mechanics and educator who was a professor and doctoral supervisor at Hohai University. He was an academician of the Chinese Academy of Sciences.

He was a delegate to the 3rd National People's Congress. He was a member of the 5th, 6th, 7th National Committee of the Chinese People's Political Consultative Conference.

Biography
He was fascinated by Chinese literature since childhood. In 1919, his family moved to Yangzhou and one year later moved again to Nanjing, where he finished primary school in a missionary school. His family settled in Beijing in 1923. He elementary studied at Beijing Private Zhicheng Middle School and secondary studied at the High School Affiliated to Beijing Normal University and Beijing Huiwen High School. In 1930, he was admitted to the Department of Civil Engineering, Tsinghua University. In 1935, he pursued advanced studies in the United States on government scholarships, first earning master's degree from Massachusetts Institute of Technology in 1936 and then master's degree from Harvard University in 1937.

On 7 July 1937, the Marco Polo Bridge Incident broke out, which marked the full invasion of the Republic of China by the Empire of Japan. He declined the sincere invitation of two MIT mentors with superior conditions, and gave up the opportunity to continue to study for a doctorate. In June 1937, he returned to China and taught at Zhejiang University. He joined the Chinese Institute of Engineers in 1941. In 1943, he was recruited by the Hydropower Survey Corps of Chongqing Resources Commission as an engineer. He participated in the preliminary design of the Three Gorges Project presided over by the Americans.

After the founding of the Communist State, in 1950, he joined the labor union organization in Shanghai. In 1951, he attended a symposium held by Shanghai Mayor Chen Yi. In 1952, he participated in establishment of East China Water Conservancy Institute (now Hohai University). He joined the Jiusan Society in 1954 and the Communist Party in September 1981, respectively.

In January 1999, he entered Jiangsu Provincial People's Hospital for treatment because of chest pain. He died on 26 August 1999, aged 88.

Publications

Honours and awards
 1980 Member of the Chinese Academy of Sciences (CAS)

References

1911 births
1999 deaths
People from Yangzhou
Engineers from Jiangsu
Tsinghua University alumni
Massachusetts Institute of Technology alumni
Harvard University alumni
Academic staff of Zhejiang University
Academic staff of Hohai University
Members of the Chinese Academy of Sciences
Delegates to the 3rd National People's Congress
Members of the 5th Chinese People's Political Consultative Conference
Members of the 6th Chinese People's Political Consultative Conference
Members of the 7th Chinese People's Political Consultative Conference